The Porsche 911 GT2 is a high-performance, track-focused sports car built by the German automobile manufacturer Porsche from 1993 to 2009, and then since 2010 as the GT2 RS. It is based on the 911 Turbo, and uses a similar twin-turbocharged engine, but features numerous upgrades, including engine enhancements, larger brakes, and stiffer suspension calibration. The GT2 is significantly lighter than the Turbo due to its use of rear-wheel-drive instead of all-wheel-drive system and the reduction or removal of interior components. As a result, the GT2 (now GT2 RS) is the most expensive and fastest model among the 911 lineup.

993 generation 

 

The 993 GT2 was initially built in order to meet homologation requirements for GT2 class racing. Because the cars were built to meet the GT2 class regulations, the road cars were named accordingly (but badged as the 911 GT). The 993 GT2 featured widened plastic fenders and a larger rear wing with air scoops in the struts for improved engine cooling.

Technical specifications 

Configuration: Air-cooled twin-turbocharged 2 valves per cylinder Porsche flat-six engine
Displacement:           
Bore × stroke:           × 
Maximum power:   at 6,000 rpm 
Specific power:  
Maximum torque:        at 3,500 rpm (1998 MY)
Specific torque:  
Length:                
Width:                
Height:               
Wheelbase:            
Front track:          
Rear track:           
Curb weight:          
Power-to-weight ratio:  259.2 W/kg (6.34 lb/hp)
Top Speed:            
0–97 km/h (60 mph): 3.9 seconds
0–161 km/h (100 mph): 8.7 seconds
1/4 mile (402 m):  12.1 seconds at

996 generation 

In 1999, the 993 was replaced with the new 996 model. The new GT2 took two years to develop and during that time, Porsche decided to abandon the GT2 for motorsports use, instead concentrating on competing in GT3 class racing with the new naturally aspirated 911 GT3.

Developed primarily as a road car in contrast to its predecessor, the new GT2 featured a twin-turbocharged version of the GT3's  flat-six engine. Like the 993 GT2, the body of the 996 GT2 differed significantly from those of other 996 variants; major differences included wider fenders, a more aggressively shaped nose, and a large rear wing.

According to road testing performed by Car and Driver magazine, the GT2 suffers from hardly any turbo lag. Despite a 10-millimeter reduction in ride height from the 911 Turbo, the drag coefficient is slightly higher —  vs. the Turbo's 0.33 — due to the fixed rear wing.

Technical specifications 

Configuration: Water-cooled twin-turbocharged Porsche flat-six engine
Valvetrain:  DOHC 4 valves per cylinder
Displacement: 
Bore × stroke:      × 
Compression ratio: 9.4:1
Maximum power:   at 5,700 rpm
Specific power:  
Maximum torque:     at 3,500 rpm
Specific torque: 
Length:            
Width:             
Height:            
Wheelbase: 	    
Front track:       
Rear track: 	    
Curb weight: 	    
Drag coefficient:  0.34 
Fuel capacity:     
Power-to-weight ratio:  248.3 W/kg (6.63 lb/hp)
Top speed: 	    
0–100 km/h (62 mph):  4.1 seconds–3.9 seconds
0–200 km/h (124 mph):  13.9 seconds–12.2 seconds
1/4 mile (402 m):  12.1 seconds

997 generation 

The 996 GT2 was superseded by the 997 GT2 in 2007 after a brief hiatus, with cars arriving at dealerships in November 2007 after an official launch at the 62nd Frankfurt Motor Show.

The GT2's engine was based on the  flat-6 engine as seen on the Turbo, but featured two variable geometry turbochargers. This made it the third Porsche production road car to exceed the  barrier, with the exception of the 1998 911 GT1 (of which only 20 units were produced for street use, solely to satisfy ACO homologation requirements for racing).

The appearance of the 997 GT2 once again differed from its sister car, the 997 Turbo. It had a revised front lip, a newly designed rear wing with two small air inlets on either side, and a revised rear bumper featuring titanium exhaust pipes and shark fin outlets.

German Porsche test driver Walter Röhrl lapped the Nürburgring Nordschleife on a public day in 7 minutes, 32 seconds in the 997 GT2.

A total of 194 units were sold in the United States and 19 units in Canada.

Technical specifications 
Technical specifications of the standard 997 GT2:

Configuration:  Water-cooled twin-turbocharged Porsche flat-six engine
Displacement:  ; 4 valves per cylinder
Bore × stroke:   × 
Compression ratio:  9.4:1
Maximum power:   at 6,500 rpm
Specific power: 
Maximum torque:   at 2,200 rpm (continuing to 4,500 rpm due to VTG effects)
Specific torque: 
Front brakes: Ventilated carbon ceramic discs with 6-piston monobloc aluminum fixed calipers & ABS
Rear brakes: Ventilated carbon ceramic discs with 4-piston monobloc aluminum fixed calipers & ABS
Length:  	         
Width: 	         
Height: 	         
Wheelbase: 	         
Curb Weight: 	         
Drag coefficient:       0.32 
Fuel tank capacity:     
Luggage Area Volume:    
Power-to-weight ratio:  275.0 W/kg (5.98 lb/hp)
Top Speed:  	         
0–100 km/h (62 mph):  3.9 seconds
0–200 km/h (124 mph): 9.8 seconds

Tests performed by American automobile magazine 
0-30 mph (48 km/h):  1.2 seconds
0-60 mph (97 km/h):  3.8 seconds
0-100 mph (161 km/h): 7.4 seconds
0-150 mph (241 km/h): 15.9 seconds
0-186 mph (300 km/h): 34.0 seconds
1/4 mile (402 m):  11.3 seconds at

997 GT2 RS 

On May 4, 2010, an RS variant was announced to German dealers in Leipzig.

According to the then Porsche Motorsports manager Andreas Preuninger, the RS was conceived around 2007 as a skunk-works effort. The 727 code number selected for the project corresponds to one of the Nissan GT-R's lap times around the Nürburgring's Nordschleife. When the dust settled, Porsche claimed that test driver Timo Kluck had supposedly eclipsed that target by an impressive nine seconds.
Porsche produced only 500 units of the 997 GT2 RS globally.

On 13 February 2022, a 2019 Porsche 911 GT2 RS driven by Jeff Morton won the 3 day Targa High Country tarmac rally by 2 minutes, 24 seconds.

991 generation 

The 991 GT2 RS was initially unveiled at the Xbox 2017 E3 briefing along with the announcement of the Forza Motorsport 7 video game where it was revealed as the cover car as well as being included as a playable vehicle.

The car was officially launched by Porsche at the 2017 Goodwood Festival of Speed along with the introduction of the 911 Turbo S Exclusive Series. Unlike the previous GT2 versions, this car is fitted with a 7-speed PDK transmission to handle the excessive torque produced from the engine.

The car has a roof made of magnesium, front lid, front and rear wings and boot lid made of carbon-fibre, front and rear apron made of lightweight polyurethane, rear and side windows made of polycarbonate and an exhaust system made of titanium.

This includes the roof, the anti-roll bars, and the coupling rods on both axles being made out of carbon-fibre, while the roll cage is made from titanium. The package also includes a set of magnesium wheels. The car was available in the United States from early 2018.

A production run of 1,000 units was planned.

The production run of the GT2 RS was to end by February 2019 but four units were lost in transit to Brazil due to the sinking of the ship Grande America on which the cars were on board in March 2019. Porsche decided to restart production to reproduce the lost cars.

This made it the fastest production car lap time recorded on the track at the time.

In 2018, Warren Luff at the wheel of the GT2 RS (without the Weissach package) set the fastest production lap record at The Bend Motorsport Park with a lap time of 3:24.079 minutes around the 7.77 km GT layout.

On 25 October 2018, a 6:40.33 minute lap time around the Nürburgring Nordschleife was set by Porsche test driver Lars Kern in a 911 GT2 RS MR prepared by Porsche-owned Manthey Racing, surpassing the previous record holder—an unmodified Lamborghini Aventador SVJ—that had deprived the GT2 RS of its record in July 2018.

In 2019 Porsche set further production lap records with the car at various North American circuits: 1:24.88 minutes at Road Atlanta, 2:15.17 minutes at Road America and 1:22.36 minutes at Canadian Tire Motorsport Park.

Technical specifications 
Technical specifications of the 2018 991.2 GT2 RS:

Configuration:  Water-cooled twin-turbocharged Porsche flat-six engine
Displacement:  ; 4 valves per cylinder
Bore × stroke:   × 
Compression ratio:  9.0:1
Redline: 7,000 rpm (rev limiter 7,200 rpm)
Maximum power:   at 7,000 rpm
Specific power:  135.5 kW/litre
Maximum torque:   at 2,200-4,500 rpm 
Specific torque: 197.4 N·m/litre
Transmission: 7-speed PDK
Front brakes: 410 mm ventilated carbon ceramic discs with 6-piston monobloc aluminum fixed calipers & ABS
Rear brakes: 390 mm ventilated carbon ceramic discs with 4-piston monobloc aluminum fixed calipers & ABS
Wheels and Tyres (front): 9.5J × 20 ET50, 265/35 ZR20
Wheels and Tyres (rear): 12.5J × 21 ET48, 325/30 ZR21
Length:  	       
Width:  
Height:  
Wheelbase: 	        
Front track:           
Rear track:            
Curb Weight: 	         (DIN)
Power-to-weight ratio: 350.3 W/kg
Fuel tank capacity:    
Luggage Area Volume:   
Drag coefficient: 0.35 
Top Speed:  	        
0–:  2.7 seconds
0–:  2.8 seconds
0–:  5.8 seconds
0–:  8.3 seconds
0–:  22.1 seconds
: 1.5 seconds
: 5.5 seconds
1/4 mile (402 m): 10.5 seconds
Turning radius: 11.1 metre

GT2 RS Clubsport 

Introduced at the 2018 LA Auto Show, the GT2 RS Clubsport is the track-only variant of the GT2 RS. New aerodynamic elements increase downforce of the car while removal of non essential components decrease weight further. Notable exterior changes include a larger motor sport oriented rear wing made from carbon fibre shared with the GT3 R, larger front air intakes with integrated LED day time running lights, carbon fibre roof with an integrated escape hatch in case of a crash, carbon fibre engine cover and bonnet along with a racing fuel cell and a new race exhaust system. 

The interior is race oriented and notable changes include an FIA-approved roll cage, a single racing bucket seat and a race steering wheel made from carbon fibre with an integrated colour display shared with the GT3 R. The car weighs a total of   less than the GT2 RS road car.

The engine and transmission remain the same as the GT2 RS while new safety features include a PSM stability management system and an ABS system, both of which are manually controlled by rotary dials present on the centre console. The GT2 RS Clubsport comes with 18-inch centre lock forged alloy wheels wrapped in Michelin racing slicks and are shared with the GT3 R race car. Production of the Clubsport is limited to 200 units.

The SRO Motorsports Group announced that a one make series featuring the GT2 RS Clubsport will be held in July 2019 at the 24 Hours of Spa Weekend. Previously, the Clubsport made its track debut at the Bathurst 12 Hour event held in January.

Motorsports

The Porsche GT2 comes from a long line of 911 Porsche Turbo racing cars in international motorsports. Starting with the 1974 911 Carrera turbo for Group 5 racing, followed by the 934 (a racing version of the 930) for Group 4 racing, then the famous Porsche 935 which dominated Group 5 and IMSA racing through 1984. In 1986 a Porsche 961 (racing version of the 959) would be created with little racing success but a leap forward in technology and development such as AWD, 4 valves per cylinder and water-cooled heads (which first appeared in the 1978 Porsche 935 Moby-Dick, used in the Porsche 956/962 GroupC prototypes and then in the 959/961). In 1993, Porsche had experimented with the extensively modified turbo 964, named the Turbo S LM-GT.  Seeing the car's potential to be fast and reliable, as well as customer demand for a car to replace the 964 Carrera RSRs, Porsche chose to develop the turbocharged 993 for customer use.

The 993 GT2 race car featured a stripped interior, integrated rollcage for safety, minor adjustments to the bodywork and wings in order to decrease weight as well as increase downforce, and wider fenders to handle racing slicks. The suspension was modified to improve racing performance, while the engine was slightly tweaked for endurance.

At the same time, Porsche also developed a GT2 Evo, able to race in the GT1 category. The Evo saw an increase in power to  through the use of larger turbochargers. The GT2 Evo was short-lived, however, as Porsche decided to replace it with the purpose-built 911 GT1 in 1996.

The GT2 and GT2 Evo were initially campaigned in the BPR Global GT Series as well as several other smaller national series, and earned seven wins in their class out of eleven rounds during their first full BPR season in 1996, as well as a class victory in the 1996 and 1997 24 Hours of Le Mans. In the new FIA GT Championship that year, although Porsche faced factory-backed competition from Chrysler, the 911 GT2s managed to win three races.  By 1998, however, the capabilities of the GT2 were unable to combat the increased number of Chrysler Viper GTS-Rs in the series, earning only a single victory.

By 1999, the GT2s had been largely overpowered by the Vipers, as well as newcomers Lister.  Despite this, a GT2 prepared by Roock Racing managed to win the GT2 class at the 24 Hours of Daytona.  An increase in engine displacement to 3.8 liters in 2000 was unable to help Porsche, and support for the project ended.  Porsche chose instead to concentrate on the new N-GT category with the GT3-R that same year.  GT2s continued to be used by private teams until 2004.

With the launch of the 996 generation GT2, several privateers attempted to continue on the motorsports history by building their own racing versions.  Belgian PSI Motorsports' 911 Bi-Turbo and German A-Level Engineering's 911 GT2-R were used with mixed success in national series such as Belcar, but were not competitive in international series.

References

External links

 Porsche Cars North America - Porsche 997 GT2 microsite
 Porsche Cars North America - 1995 Porsche 911 GT2
 Porsche Cars North America - 1995 Porsche 911 GT2 Evo

911 GT2
Sports cars
Cars introduced in 1993
Rear-wheel-drive vehicles
Grand tourer racing cars
24 Hours of Le Mans race cars
Rear-engined vehicles
Cars powered by boxer engines